Novillo is a surname. Notable people with the surname include:

Edmundo Novillo (born 1963), Bolivian lawyer, politician and Governor of Cochabamba
Harry Novillo (born 1992), Martiniquais footballer
Joaquín Novillo (born 1998), Argentine footballer
José María Cruz Novillo (born 1936), Spanish sculptor, engraver, painter and designer
Mariano Sanz Novillo (born 1989), Spanish footballer

See also 
Lake Novillo, lake in Sonora, Mexico, near the city of San Pedro de la Cueva